Anne Sophie Callesen (born 25 December 1988 in Aarhus) is a Danish politician, who is a member of the Folketing for the Social Liberal Party. She was elected into the Folketing in the 2019 Danish general election.

Political career
Callesen was elected into the Folketing at the 2019 election, receiving 1,926 votes.

External links 
 Biography on the website of the Danish Parliament (Folketinget)

References 

Living people
1988 births
People from Aarhus
21st-century Danish women politicians
Women members of the Folketing
Danish Social Liberal Party politicians
Members of the Folketing 2019–2022